Frants Kostyukevich (born April 4, 1963) is a male race walker who represented the USSR and later Belarus.

Achievements

External links

1963 births
Living people
Belarusian male racewalkers
Soviet male racewalkers
World Athletics Championships athletes for the Soviet Union
World Athletics Championships athletes for Belarus
World Athletics Race Walking Team Championships winners
World Athletics Indoor Championships medalists